is a Japanese football player. She plays for Nojima Stella in Japans WE League. She played for Japan national team.

Club career
Sugita was born in Zama on March 14, 1992. After graduating from Kibi International University, she joined Iga FC Kunoichi in 2014.

National team career
In May 2014, Sugita was selected Japan national team for 2014 Asian Cup. At this competition, on May 18, she debuted against Jordan. Japan won the championship. She played 6 games and scored 2 goals for Japan until 2017.

National team statistics

International goals

References

External links

Japan Football Association
Iga FC Kunoichi

1992 births
Living people
Kibi International University alumni
People from Zama, Kanagawa
Association football people from Kanagawa Prefecture
Japanese women's footballers
Japan women's international footballers
Nadeshiko League players
Iga FC Kunoichi players
Women's association football midfielders
Universiade silver medalists for Japan
Universiade medalists in football
Medalists at the 2011 Summer Universiade
Nadeshiko League MVPs